Flight test centers around the world all have similar missions: to conduct flight research and testing of new aircraft concepts and prototypes. Notable centers are listed below (by year of foundation):

Government establishments
 U.K. Aeroplane and Armament Experimental Establishment, based at Boscombe Down, England (founded 1917)
 U.S. Navy Air Warfare Test Center, based at Naval Air Station Patuxent River, Maryland, United States (founded 1918, as the Navy's Flight Test Group based at Naval Air Station Anacostia)
 Swedish Armed Forces Flight Test and Evaluation Center (FMV:PROV is a part of FMV), based at Linköping, Sweden (founded 1933)
Italian Air Force Flight Test Center (Reparto Sperimentale di Volo), based at Pratica di Mare (founded 1935) 
 Russian State Flight Research and Test Center, based at Zhukovsky, Russia (founded 1941)
 I.N.T.A. Spanish Aerospace Research and Test Center, based at Torrejón de Ardoz, Community of Madrid, Spain (founded 1942)
CLAEX Spanish Air Force Experimentation Center, based at Torrejón de Ardoz, Spain (founded 1992)
 U.S. Air Force Test Center, based at Edwards Air Force Base, California, United States (founded 1942, as the new location of 477th Air Base Headquarters and Test Squadron)
 Flight Test Center (CEV) of the French Ministry of Armed Forces (CEV is a part of Directorate General of Armaments ), based at 217 Air Base in Brétigny-sur-Orge, France (founded 1945)
 NASA Flight Research Center, based at Edwards Air Force Base, California, United States (founded 1946, as the Muroc Flight Test Unit)
 NRC Institute for Aerospace Research, based at Ottawa and Montreal, Canada (founded 1951, as the National Aeronautical Establishment - NAE)
 Brazilian Air Force Flight Testing and Research Institute (part of CTA), São José dos Campos, Brazil (founded 1953)
 Japan Air Self-Defense Force Flight Test Center, based at Gifu Air Field, Japan (founded 1955)
 DLR German Aerospace Research and Test Center, based at Braunschweig, Germany (founded 1956)
 WTD 61 German Armed Forces Flight Test Center, based at Manching, Germany (founded 1957 as Testing Center for Military Aerial Equipment at Oberpfaffenhofen)
Indian Air Force Test Pilot School, Bangalore, India (founded 1957)
 U.S. Army Aviation Technical Test Center, currently based at Redstone Arsenal, Huntsville, Alabama, United States (founded 1957, as the U.S. Army Aviation Test Board based at Fort Rucker)
 China Flight Test Establishment, based at Xi'an, China (founded 1959)
 Swiss Air Force Flight Test Center (aviation branch of the Swiss Federal Office for Defence Procurement), based at Emmen Air Base, Emmen, Switzerland (founded 1964)
 Aerospace Engineering Test Establishment, based at Cold Lake, Alberta, and Ottawa, Ontario, Canada (founded 1967, as the Royal Canadian Air Force Flight Test and Evaluation Squadron No. 448)
 Israeli Air Force Flight Test Center (Manat), based at Tel Nof Airbase, Rehovot (founded 1978)
 JAXA Flight Research Center, based at Chofu Aerodrome, Nagoya Airfield and Taiki Aerospace Research Field

Corporate establishments
 CASA Flight Test Center, based at the Getafe Air Base, Spain (founded 1924)
 SAAB Flight Test Center, based at Linköping, Sweden (founded 1932)
 BAE Systems Flight Test Center, based at Warton Aerodrome, England (founded 1947)
 Airbus Defence and Space Flight Test Center, based at Manching, Germany (founded 1962, as the Messerschmitt Company Flight Test Center)
 Sikorsky Development Flight Center, based at West Palm Beach, Florida, United States (founded 1977)
 TCOM Corporation production and flight test site (including the historic Weeksville Dirigible Hangar) for development of lighter-than-air technologies and testing airships, located at the former Naval Air Station Weeksville in Elizabeth City, North Carolina, United States (founded 1986)
 Bombardier Aerospace Flight Test Center (BFTC), based at the Dwight D. Eisenhower National Airport, Wichita, Kansas, United States (founded 1991, as reconstruction of the acquired in 1990 Learjet facility)
 Embraer Flight Test Center, based at Embraer Unidade aerodrome, Gavião Peixoto, Brazil (founded 2001) 
 Bell Flight Research Center, based at Arlington, Texas, United States
 IAI Flight Test Center,  based at Ben Gurion Airport, Israel

See also
List of test pilot schools

References 

Aerospace research institutes
Aviation research institutes
Space technology research institutes
Aerospace engineering organizations